Capital & Centric Ltd is a Manchester-based property developer.

The company was formed in November 2011, when Capital Commercial Properties, started by Adam Higgins, and Centric Property Group, started by Tim Heatley, merged to form a single corporate entity.

Projects
Capital & Centric often focus on regeneration projects that aspire to the creation of jobs in the local area. However, the creation of these jobs has yet to be demonstrated. It was reported in 2022 that they have over £500m of property under construction. In the last 10 years, they have worked on 2,000,000 sq ft of development.

Developments are predominantly in the North West, Yorkshire and Midlands. According to the Manchester Evening News, Capital & Centric are one of the most active property companies in the North West.

The company is known for its projects pertaining to conversation of heritage buildings into mixed use developments and residential schemes. It is also known for converting mills and heritage buildings into residential and commercial spaces.

Piccadilly East

Capital & Centric started the regeneration of Piccadilly East with the purchase of Grade ll listed Crusader Works in 2015. The 200 year old mill has been restored into 123 apartments, for sale to owner-occupiers only with private green residents' courtyard. However, the project remains unfinished, still classed as a “live building site” with significant defects and shortcomings relative to the claimed specification. Additionally, Capital & Centric have let properties in the development out, at odds with their owner-occupier only strapline.  Manchester Evening News reported about people queuing for the apartment sale when the first sale was made public in 2017 for “locals only” and investors were banned. 

The company is also known for Phoenix, an industrial style new build residential project with 75 homes. Adjacent to Crusader, Phoenix home owners share the gardens and investors are also banned, however the developer themselves seems to be exempt from this rule as they have also let flats out due to struggles with selling remaining units.

During the construction of Crusader, Capital & Centric used the building as a meanwhile use space for independent pop-ups, such as Track Brewery and Chapeltown Picture House. They also hosted charity events like Art Battle and Mancunian Spray to raise funds to tackle homelessness. However, they did not support the art community that was previously using the space with relocation following their purchase of the property, with predictably negative social impacts on the local community.

The company completed the restoration of Grade II listed Ducie Street Warehouse in 2019. It is made up of 162 aparthotel suits, a bar and restaurant, mini-cinema, coffee shop, gym meeting rooms and all day lounge.  

Capital & Centric completed its Jenga inspired hotel on Adair Street in 2022, which is now operated by Leonardo Hotels. 

Its next project in Piccadilly East is Ferrous, a £28m project with 107 rental apartments, two commercial units and the Cabin, a new space for pop-ups.

The regeneration of Piccadilly East featured on the BBC Two docuseries Manctopia: Billion Pound Property Boom. The Times named the area as one of the ‘next greatest place to live’ in 2020.

Kampus 
The company is also known for Kampus, created in partnership with Henry Boot Developments. Kampus is a private rented project located in central Manchester, on the former Manchester Metropolitan University campus. 

The mixed-used development includes the restoration of listed buildings, Minto & Turner and Minshull House, a 1960s Brutalist building called The Stack and two new build apartment blocks. The scheme is home to a number of independent commercial units, including Pollen, Nell’s, The Beeswing, Yum Cha, Madre, Cloudwater, General Store, Great North Pie, Red Light and Barkside. Kampus also home to The Bungalow, the former security cabin on stilts, which serves as a pop-up space. In 2022, it was nominated as best pop-up at Manchester Food and Drink Festival.

Kampus is well known for its new public spaces, including the re-opening of Little David Street, thought to be one of the only untouched cobbled streets in Manchester and the lush public gardens overlooking the canal. Manchester Confidential are reported to have described the Kampus garden as an oasis, adding it is ‘The most enchanting of all the new spaces accessible to the public’.

Littlewoods 
Another regeneration project is the Littlewoods Pools Building, set to become a new £35m film and TV studio hub. As a result of the regeneration, hundreds of jobs will be created. The Littlewoods scheme was unanimously approved in 2013. In 2018 it was announced that Twickenham Studios would be opening a £50m major new complex at Littlewoods, taking 85,000 sq ft of the 300,000 sq ft space. The project is expected to generate more than 570 jobs and to support some 2,000 further jobs in the region, providing a boost of up to £124m to the local economy, according to statistics drawn up by economics firm Ekosgen.

In September 2018 a fire damaged the building, however reports and the developers state that this would not hamper project milestones and completion. Liverpool John Moore's University signed on to take 75,000sq of space in the studios as the official education partner in September 2020. According to CBRE this was the largest commercial letting in the North West of that year.

Eyewitness Works 
In 2018 Capital & Centric announced its plan to transform Eye Witness Works on Milton Street in Sheffield into around 100 apartments, after acquiring the building from Sheffield Council. The Grade-II listed former cutlery works, which dates back to 1852, produced pocket and kitchen knives in industrious pre-war Britain, for 150 years.

It was revealed in 2022 that Eye Witness Works would be home of new Channel 4 interior design TV show, where the winner wins the apartment they designed.

Other projects

As of 2022, Capital & Centric has a number of projects underway in Greater Manchester, including Weir Mill in Stockport, Farnworth, Ancoats Works, Talbot Mill, Ferrous and Swan Steet which is currently home to Ramona and the Firehouse.

In 2022, the company’s plans for the Goods Yard in Stoke-on-Trent were approved. The project will be a mixed-used development with 174 new homes, work space, shops, café-bars and a new public square.

In 2015 Capital & Centric announced housebuilding arm Nowhaus, now known as Neighbourhood which aims to build twice as many homes on a site as traditional housebuilders.

The company announced that its Bunker scheme in Liverpool in 2017, adjacent to the Littlewoods building. In 2015, the company announced it had secured the first tenant for its Tempest office development in Liverpool city centre. In 2016, the company completed construction on the Foundry in Salford.

Social Impact Aims 
The company is known for Regeneration Brainery initiative, which is a free education platform for young people to get into property. Co-founder of Capital & Centric Tim Heatley is the chair of Manchester Mayor Andy Burnham's Greater Manchester Mayor's Charity. 

During 2018, the organisation launched an initiative to tackle homelessness with charity Embassy where ex-tour buses are used to provide temporary accommodation for rough sleepers. In 2021, plans for Embassy Village were approved, which include 40 high quality modular homes, a village hall, outdoor space for allotments and sports, along with additional support to help homeless and vulnerable men get back on their feet. 

In May 2019, Raise the Roof, a concert for the Greater Manchester Mayor's Charity raised more than £100,000 to help rough sleeping in the city-region. In 2020, to support the community during the Coronavirus pandemic Capital & Centric, and partners Kamani Property Group, used their development on Swan Street in Manchester city centre as a drop off point for essential items to help those affected by homelessness in and around Manchester.

References

External links
 Official site

Property companies of the United Kingdom